JW Marriott Indianapolis is a hotel in downtown Indianapolis, adjacent to the Indiana Convention Center. The new JW Marriott Indianapolis is part of the $450 million Marriott Place, consisting of five Marriott hotels all connected to the Indiana Convention Center. The City of Indianapolis contributed $48 million to the project. The facility also has a 950 space underground parking garage. It is the third-largest JW Marriott hotel in the world based on its 1,005 guest rooms, and is owned and managed by White Lodging.

Facilities
The JW Marriott has 637 double rooms, 343 "lavish king rooms", and 25 luxury suites. The hotel features 54 meeting rooms with a total of 104,000 square feet, three restaurants, and the largest ballroom of any hotel in the Midwest and also one of the largest Marriott ballrooms in the world. The JW Marriott Indianapolis has three restaurants.

According to the Indianapolis Business Journal, the JW Marriott Indianapolis has 600 full-time employees. As of 2020, three dining options were located in the hotel, including High Velocity, Osteria Pronto (OP) Italian, and Starbucks.

Window displays

Since its opening in 2011, the JW Marriott Indianapolis has displayed five "jumbo" graphics on its east-facing concave curtain wall. Indianapolis-based Sports Graphics has partnered with the hotel in 2012, 2015, 2016, 2017, 2018, 2019 and 2020 for the displays, which have included the Vince Lombardi Trophy (commemorating Super Bowl XLVI), an NCAA bracket (commemorating the 2015 NCAA Men's Division I Basketball Championship Game), and the Borg-Warner Trophy (commemorating the 100th running of the Indianapolis 500).

See also
List of tallest buildings in Indianapolis
List of tallest buildings in Indiana

References

External links

 JW Marriott Indianapolis at SkyscraperPage
JW Marriott Indianapolis at Emporis

Hotel buildings completed in 2011
JW Marriott Hotels
Skyscraper hotels in Indianapolis
2011 establishments in Indiana